The Stepped Stone Structure is the name given to the remains at a particular archaeological site (sometimes termed Area G) on the eastern side of the City of David, the oldest part of Jerusalem. The curved, narrow stone structure is built over a series of terraces (hence the name). A casemate wall adjoins the structure from a northerly direction at the upper levels, and may have been the original city wall.

Excavation and interpretation
Macalister, the first to excavate the structure in the 1920s, called the remains he had found a "ramp" and believed it to be Jebusite. Work continued in the 1960s with Kathleen Kenyon, who dated the structure to the start of Iron Age II (1000–900 BCE). Yigal Shiloh excavated in the 1970s–80s. After the discoveries by Kenyon and Shiloh, some scholars have suggested that the structure might be a retaining wall, or a fortress. Israel Finkelstein et al. propose and argue that the upper part of the structure was either built, or substantially rebuilt in the Hasmonean period.

Millo

It is hypothesized that the structure may be the Biblical Millo. A recent excavation by Eilat Mazar directly above the Stepped Stone Structure shows that the structure connects with and supports the Large Stone Structure. Mazar's interpretation of the evidence yields her hypothesis that the Large Stone Structure was an Israelite royal palace in continuous use from the tenth century until 586 BCE. Millo is derived from "fill", (Hebrew milui). The stepped stone support structure is built of fills.

See also
 Large Stone Structure
 Millo

References

Siloam
Ancient sites in Jerusalem
City of David